A referee is a person of authority in a number of sports games. 

Specific sports referees include:
 Referee (American football)
 Referee (association football)
 Referee (basketball)
 Referee (boxing)
 Referee (futsal)
 Referee (ice hockey)
 Referee (professional wrestling)
 Referee (rugby league)
 Referee (rugby union)
 Referee (tennis)
 Umpire in other sports

A referee may also be:
 One who engages in scholarly peer review
 One who provides a reference
 In law, a special referee, a judge who acts on matters of fact only
 A gamemaster for a role-playing game

Referee or The Referee may also refer to:
 Referee (Queoff), a public sculpture by Tom Queoff in Milwaukee, Wisconsin, US
 The Referee (newspaper), published in Sydney, Australia from 1886 to 1939
 The Referee (1922 film), an American silent sports drama film
 The Referee (2010 film), a Swedish documentary
 Sunday Referee, a British newspaper founded as The Referee
 Referee, a magazine on sports officiating published in Wisconsin, U.S.

See also 
 Arbitrator, a person authorized to resolve legal disputes
 Refer (disambiguation)
 Reference (disambiguation)
 Umpire (disambiguation)